Frank Famiano (born April 22, 1961) is an American former wrestler who competed in the 1984 Summer Olympics.

References

External links
 

1961 births
Living people
Olympic wrestlers of the United States
Wrestlers at the 1984 Summer Olympics
American male sport wrestlers
Pan American Games medalists in wrestling
Pan American Games bronze medalists for the United States
Wrestlers at the 1991 Pan American Games
Medalists at the 1991 Pan American Games
20th-century American people